Yélimané Cercle is an administrative subdivision of the Kayes Region of Mali.  Its administrative centre (chef-lieu) is the town of Yélimané.  In the 2009 census the population of the cercle was 178,442.

Yélimané Cercle is a major center of gold mining.

The cercle is subdivided into 12 communes:
Diafounou Diongaga 
Diafounou Gory
Fanga
Gory
Guidimé
Kirané Kaniaga
Konsiga
Kremis
Marekaffo
Soumpou
 Toya
Tringa

References

External links
.

Cercles of Mali